The Hamilton Skyhawks are a Canadian Exhibition Basketball Team out of Hamilton, Ontario formed in 2020.

They were a professional basketball franchise based in Hamilton, Ontario that played in the World Basketball League and the National Basketball League in 1992 and 1993. The team joined the WBL as an expansion team for the 1992 season. However, the WBL folded before completion of that season. Some of the Canadian WBL teams, including the Skyhawks, formed their own league for 1993 called the National Basketball League. The Skyhawks did not complete that season either, moving to Edmonton, Alberta before the 1993 NBL playoffs.

The Skyhawks home court is the FirstOntario Center.

Sources
WBL Statistics
NBL Statistics

National Basketball League (Canada) teams
Sports teams in Hamilton, Ontario
Defunct basketball teams in Canada
Basketball teams established in 1992
Basketball teams disestablished in 1993
World Basketball League teams
1992 establishments in Ontario
1993 disestablishments in Ontario